Stephen Conant Smith (born May 29, 1944) is a former American football player.  Smith was born in St. Louis, Missouri, and attended Maine East High School in suburban Chicago.  He played college football at the end position for the University of Michigan from 1963 to 1965. He was selected by the San Francisco 49ers in the fifth round (71st overall pick) of the 1966 NFL Draft.  He played eight seasons in the National Football League at the offensive tackle and defensive end positions for the Pittsburgh Steelers (1966), Minnesota Vikings (1968–70), and Philadelphia Eagles (1971–74). He was traded along with second- and sixth-round selections in 1971 (50th and 154th overall–Hank Allison and Mississippi defensive back Wyck Neely respectively) and a 1972 third-round pick (76th overall–Bobby Majors) from the Vikings to the Eagles for Norm Snead on January 28, 1971.

References

1944 births
Living people
Players of American football from St. Louis
American football defensive ends
American football offensive tackles
Michigan Wolverines football players
Pittsburgh Steelers players
Minnesota Vikings players
Philadelphia Eagles players